52P/Harrington–Abell is a periodic comet in the Solar System.

It was discovered by Robert G. Harrington and George O. Abell in 1955 on plates from the Palomar Sky Survey taken with the 49-inch Samuel Oschin telescope.

It has been seen on every apparition since then. With a period of about seven years, it has been seen close to its perihelia in 1954, 1962, 1969, 1976, 1983, 1991, and 2006. Its orbital period changed from 7.2 to 7.6 years when it passed 0.04 AU from Jupiter in April, 1974. It typically gets no brighter than about magnitude 17.

In 1998/1999, it was unexpectedly bright. When recovered on July 21, 1998, by Alain Maury, he expected it to be about magnitude 21 or 22. Instead, he found it to be thousands of times brighter at magnitude 12.2. The next night, its brightness was estimated by others at magnitude 10.9 to 11.8. It may have had a second outburst about 80 days before perihelion. It finally faded to dimmer than magnitude 12 by the end of March, 1999.

At its return in 2006, it returned to normal brightness.

References

External links 
 Orbital simulation from JPL (Java) / Horizons Ephemeris
 52P/Harrington-Abell – Seiichi Yoshida @ aerith.net

Periodic comets
0052
Summer Science Program
Comets in 2014
19550322